Shoppers Stop is an Indian department store chain, owned by the K Raheja Corp. There are 86 stores across 40 cities in India, with clothing, accessories, handbags, shoes, jewellery, fragrances, cosmetics, health and beauty products, home furnishing, and decor products.

History
The first store was opened in Andheri, Mumbai on 27th Oct 1991.

The company opened its 22nd store at Lucknow in 2006. In 2007, it entered into partnership with Nuance Group AG, and opened stores in Mumbai T1 and Bengaluru Airports.

An e-store with delivery across major cities in India was launched in 2008, with a smartphone app in 2016.

In June 2018, the retail chain underwent a board rejig in which promoter Chandru L Raheja resigned as the non-executive chairman after having served for over two decades.

Chandru Raheja was succeeded by BS Nagesh.

Awards
Shoppers Stop Ltd has been awarded "the Hall of Fame" and won "the Emerging Market Retailer of the Year Award", by the World Retail Congress at Barcelona, in April 2008.

Shoppers Stop is listed on the BSE and National Stock Exchange of India. As of 2013, Shoppers Stop had 83 stores in India.

Brands Under Shoppers Stop 
 Homestop
 Crossword Bookstores
 Estèe Lauder
 MAC
 Clinique
 BOBBI BROWN
 Stop

References

External links 
 

Companies based in Mumbai
Retail companies established in 1991
Department stores of India
Clothing retailers of India
Indian companies established in 1991
1991 establishments in Maharashtra